The 2009–10 New Zealand Cricket Women's One Day Competition was a 50-over women's cricket competition that took place in New Zealand. It ran from December 2009 to January 2010, with 6 provincial teams taking part. Central Hinds won the competition by virtue of topping the group stage after the final was abandoned due to rain.

The tournament ran alongside the 2009–10 New Zealand Cricket Women's Twenty20, which Central Hinds also won.

Competition format 
Teams played in a double round-robin in a group of six, therefore playing 10 matches overall. Matches were played using a one day format with 50 overs per side. The top two in the group advanced to the final.

The group worked on a points system with positions being based on the total points. Points were awarded as follows:

Win: 4 points 
Tie: 2 points 
Loss: 0 points.
Abandoned/No Result: 2 points.
Bonus Point: 1 point awarded for run rate in a match being 1.25x that of opponent.

Points table

Source: CricketArchive

 Advanced to the Final

Final

Statistics

Most runs

Source: ESPN Cricinfo

Most wickets

Source: ESPN Cricinfo

References

External links
 Series home at ESPN Cricinfo

Hallyburton Johnstone Shield
2009–10 New Zealand cricket season
New Zealand Cricket Women's One Day Competition